Le Château-d'Oléron is a commune located on the Island of Oléron, in the Charente-Maritime department, southwestern France.

The town is surrounded by fortifications in the form of a Bastion fort (similar to a "star fort".)

Population

See also
 Communes of the Charente-Maritime department

References

External links
 

Communes of Charente-Maritime
Oléron
Charente-Maritime communes articles needing translation from French Wikipedia
Star forts
Oléron
Populated coastal places in France